Peter Daenens (born 23 November 1960 in Bruges) is a Belgian former middle distance runner who competed in the 1984 Summer Olympics.

References

1960 births
Living people
Sportspeople from Bruges
Belgian male middle-distance runners
Olympic athletes of Belgium
Athletes (track and field) at the 1984 Summer Olympics
Belgian male steeplechase runners
Universiade medalists in athletics (track and field)
World Athletics Championships athletes for Belgium
Universiade gold medalists for Belgium
Medalists at the 1983 Summer Universiade